Neea buxifolia, the tropical boxwood, is a species of flowering plant in the saltwood genus Neea (family Nyctaginaceae), native to Puerto Rico and the Virgin Islands. It is used in bonsai.

References

buxifolia
Plants used in bonsai
Flora of Puerto Rico
Flora of the Leeward Islands
Plants described in 1896